Marfa Rabkova (Belarusian and ; born 6 January 1995) is a Belarusian human rights activist and part of the Viasna Human Rights Centre. In 2020 she was arrested by the Belarusian authorities for her activism and sent to the pre-trial prison SIZO No. 1. In 2021 she was awarded the Homo Homini Award together with three other arrested Belarusian human rights activists.

Biography
Marfa (Maria) Rabkova was born in 1995. She attended the Belarusian State Pedagogical University but was forced to withdraw after being detained on a march near a university building. She then enrolled at the A. Kuleshov Mogilev State University but claimed that she was unable to complete her studies and find a job due to pressure from the authorities. In 2017 she entered the European Humanities University in Vilnius, Lithuania. In 2019 she became a manager of the volunteers' network of Viasna Human Rights Centre in Belarus.

In 2020 Rabkova volunteered with the Viasna Human Rights Centre over the course of the 2020 Belarusian presidential election. At the start of the mass protests, she began to document evidence of torture and abuse by the Belarusian authorities. She was detained on 17 September 2020. On 19 September 2021 she was transferred to SIZO No. 1 in Minsk. Several Belarusian human rights groups recognized her as a political prisoner. International human rights organizations Amnesty International, Front Line Defenders, and the Observatory for the Protection of Human Rights Defenders demanded her immediate release. Bundestag member Agnieszka Brugger became her "godfather". In the pre-trial prison her health worsened; she complained about abdominal pain, tooth pain, and inflammation of the lymph nodes but did not get adequate medical treatment. According to her husband, she lost 20kg in prison, contracted COVID-19, and started to experience fainting and low blood pressure. She also wasn't allowed to attend her father's funeral.

Initially, Rabkova was charged under article 293 of the Criminal Code (part 3, "Training or other preparation of persons for participation in mass riots, or financing of this activity"). On 11 February 2021 she was charged with two other articles  — 130 ("Incitement to hatred") and 285 (part 2, "Participation in a criminal organization"). Based on these charges, she faced the possibility of being imprisoned for up to 12 years.

In 2021 Rabkova was awarded the Homo Homini Award together with three other arrested Belarusian human rights activists.

References

External links

1995 births
Living people
Belarusian women activists
Amnesty International prisoners of conscience held by Belarus
Belarusian political prisoners
21st-century Belarusian women
Political prisoners according to Viasna Human Rights Centre